Donald L. Dahl (March 19, 1945 – April 18, 2014) was an American politician.

Born in Hillsboro, Kansas, Dahl served in the United States Navy and then received his bachelor's degree from Tabor College. He served in the Kansas House of Representatives, as a Republican, from 1997 to 2008 and was speaker pro tem. In December 2013, Dahl was appointed to the Kansas Supreme Court Nominating Commission. He died while piloting an ultralight aircraft near Hillsboro, Kansas.

References

1945 births
2014 deaths
People from Hillsboro, Kansas
Tabor College (Kansas) alumni
Accidental deaths in Kansas
Republican Party members of the Kansas House of Representatives
Aviators killed in aviation accidents or incidents in the United States
United States Navy sailors
Military personnel from Kansas
Victims of aviation accidents or incidents in 2014
20th-century American politicians
21st-century American politicians